Gigi (pronounced ) is an Indonesian rock band led by founder, Armand Maulana, and songwriter Dewa Budjana. Formed in March 1994, the band has released fifteen studio albums. Other than their hit songs "11 Januari", "Nakal", and "My Facebook" which achieve moderate success in Indonesia, the band is known for their releases of religious compilation albums, international recognition and solo career of guitarist Dewa Budjana, and the audition of vocalist of Armand Maulana for INXS.

History
1993- 1994: Early Days and Formation

Armand Maulana already has an established musical career, being the lead singer of Next Band, and released his solo album "Kau Tetap Milikku". Aria Baron's career is also on the step-up since he joined and later quit Lost Angels (which later changed name to Boomerang) and Badai Band (which later changed name to /rif). Thomas Ramdhan (bass) and Ronald Fristianto (drums) has known each other for a long time, and often invited the session players for Pay Burman (ex-Slank).

At that time, Dewa Budjana is starting his career, but no one wants to play music with him, which he later said "Maybe because my music is not standard".  Later, Budjana was invited by Fariz RM to fill the guitars in his song "Cinta di Balik Noda", with Meriam Bellina as the guest vocals. Then, he recorded with Spirit band, and become the session player of Twilite Orchestra.

In September 1993, Budjana, Thomas, and Ronald hanged out in Triple M studio in Central Jakarta. Pay, who's there at that time, asked Budjana "Budj, why don't you start a band with Ronald and Thomas?". Agreed, then the trio started to do rehearsals at Studio 45 in Pondok Indah, South Jakarta. With Pierre (later joined Ronald in dr.pm) as temporary vocalist, the trio was later joined by Armand Maulana as the main vocalist, and used the name BDH (Beri Daku Harapan - Give Me Hope) as the temporary name of the band.

On deciding the name of the band, Budjana jokingly say "Orangutan". With everyone laugh at that name, Budjana then again jokingly say "Gigi" (meaning "Teeth" in Bahasa Indonesia). However, the name Gigi is approved by the other members.

1994-1996: Angan, Dunia, 3/4, and Formation Change

In 1994, Gigi released their first full length, "Angan", which expected to be sold around 100,000 copies. The second album "Dunia" was released in 1995, with hit songs of "Janji" and "Nirwana".  A year later, Baron later left the band to continue his studies in United States. In that same year, Ronald was suspicious about Thomas' addiction to substances, which soured their relationship.

The band released their 3rd album "3/4" in 1996, which Thomas then left the band and went into rehabilitation. Gigi then recruited Opet Alatas, former crew member to replace Thomas. Ronald then quit the band to pursue his career in "dr.pm", and was replaced by Budhy Haryono.

1996-2004 : 2x2, The Return of Thomas, Continuation of the Band

Wanting to continue the band, Armand and Budjana released the next album "2x2", which considered ambitious since involved Indra Lesmana, and Billy Sheehan (the bassist of Mr. Big) as session players, and with mixing and mastering process done in the United States.

In 1999, Opet quit the band to allow Thomas rejoined the band after he finished rehabilitation process. In 2004, Budhy Haryono left the band and replaced by Gusti Hendy.

2004–Present: Current Formation, and Spiritual Albums

As of 2023, Gigi has released 13 main studio albums, which the latest release was recorded in Abbey Road Studios.

Since 2004, Gigi has continuously released side albums during Eid al-Fitr, which consisted of rearranged cover songs and new written songs. Starting with "Raihlah Kemenangan", as of 2023 the band has released eight spiritual albums, which considered separate from their studio releases. Armand said "In the past, we heard lot of Indonesian religious albums, especially Bimbo (artist)", and later said that Armand want to bring back the atmosphere of hearing religious songs during fasting period.

International Recognition
Having moderate success in Indonesia, the founding member Armand Maulana and Dewa Budjana has international recognition as solo artists, with Armand's notable audition for INXS, and Budjana's solo career which placed him as one of the best Indonesian guitarists of all time.

Dewa Budjana's Solo Career

Since Gigi's release of 2x2, guitarist Dewa Budjana has been internationally recognized, and established as one of Indonesia's greatest guitarist of all time. In Budjana's solo album "Mahandini", he recruited international well-known musicians such as Jordan Rudess (from Dream Theater, Liquid Tension Experiment), John Frusciante (from Red Hot Chili Peppers), Mohini Dey, and Marco Minnemann (from The Aristocrats). He also collaborated with grammy winning Vinnie Colaiuta and Antonio Sanchez, also world known musicians such as Peter Erskine, Jimmy Johnson, Joe Locke, Gary Husband, Jack DeJohnette, Tony Levin, Bob Mintzer and Guthrie Govan.

Armand's Audition for INXS

In 2005, Armand Maulana was secretly invited to INXS' audition to replace Michael Hutchence in Rock Star: INXS. When the news broke, Dewa Budjana suggested to disband the band if Armand left Gigi. In the pre-audition, INXS' personnels then requested to the producer of the show to cancel the TV series, and just to proceed with Armand, since his voice sounds similar to the late Michael Hutchence. However, since Armand is late to register to the audition, even though he already considered as one of the 15 shortlisted candidate, Armand is not participating in the series, and acts as an observer of the auditions.

Discography

Studio albums
Angan, 1994
Dunia (World), 1995
3/4, 1996
2 X 2, 1997
Kilas Balik, 1998
Baik, 1999
Untuk Semua Umur (For All Ages), 2001
Salam Kedelapan, 2003
Next Chapter, 2006
Peace, Love 'n Respect, 2007
Gigi, 2009
Sweet 17, 2011
Live At Abbey, 2014
Other Releases

 Raihlah Kemenangan, 2004
Raihlah Kemenangan (Repackage), 2005
Pintu Sorga (Heaven's Door), 2006
Jalan Kebenaran (The Right Way), 2008
Amnesia, 2010
Aku dan Aku (Me and I), 2012
Mohon Ampun, 2015
Setia Bersama Menyayangi dan Mencintai, 2017
Compilation
 The Greatest Hits Live, 2000
 The Best of Gigi, 2002

Soundtrack

 Ost. Brownies, 2004

Band members

Current members
Armand Maulana – lead vocals (1994–present)
Dewa Budjana – guitar (1994–present)
Thomas Ramdhan – bass (1994–1996; 1999–present)
Gusti Hendy – drums (2004–present)

Former members
Aria Baron – guitar (1994–1995; died 2021)
Ronald Fristianto – drums (1994–1996)
Opet Alatas – bass (1996–1999)
Budhy Haryono – drums (1996–2004)

Timeline

See also
 List of Indonesian rock bands

References

Anugerah Musik Indonesia winners
Indonesian pop music groups
Indonesian rock music groups